"Dreams" is a song by British-American rock band Fleetwood Mac from their eleventh studio album, Rumours (1977). In the United States, "Dreams" was released as the second single from Rumours in March 1977, while in the United Kingdom, the song was released as the third single in June 1977. A stage performance of "Dreams" was used as the promotional music video.

In the US, "Dreams" sold more than one million copies and reached the top spot on the Billboard Hot 100, the band's only number-one single in the country. In Canada, "Dreams" also reached number one on the RPM Top 100 Singles chart.

In late 2020, the song experienced a widespread resurgence in popularity as a result of a viral TikTok video created by Nathan Apodaca. The song subsequently re-entered national music charts in certain countries and also entered the Spotify and Apple Music charts in certain countries. "Dreams" was ranked number nine on [[Rolling Stone|Rolling Stones]] 2021 list of "The 500 Greatest Songs of All Time".

Background and composition
The members of Fleetwood Mac were experiencing emotional upheavals while recording the Rumours album. Mick Fleetwood was going through a divorce. Christine McVie and John McVie were separating, while Lindsey Buckingham and Stevie Nicks were ending their eight-year relationship. "We had to go through this elaborate exercise of denial," explained Buckingham to Blender magazine, "keeping our personal feelings in one corner of the room while trying to be professional in the other."

Stevie Nicks wrote the song in early 1976 at Record Plant studio in Sausalito, California. "One day when I wasn't required in the main studio," remembers Nicks to Blender magazine, "I took a Fender Rhodes piano and went into another studio that was said to belong to Sly Stone, of Sly and the Family Stone. It was a black-and-red room, with a sunken pit in the middle where there was a piano, and a big black-velvet bed with Victorian drapes."

"I sat down on the bed with my keyboard in front of me," continues Nicks. "I found a drum pattern, switched my little cassette player on and wrote 'Dreams' in about 10 minutes. Right away I liked the fact that I was doing something with a dance beat, because that made it a little unusual for me."

When Nicks played the song to the rest of the group, "They weren't nuts about it. But I said 'Please! Please record this song, at least try it.' Because the way I play things sometimes... you really have to listen." The band recorded it the following day. Only a basic track was recorded at Sausalito, with Nicks playing the Rhodes piano and singing. Recording assistant Cris Morris remembers how "all (they) kept was the drum track and live vocal from Stevie – the guitars and bass were added later in Los Angeles." Christine McVie described the song as having "just three chords and one note in the left hand" and "boring" when Nicks played a rough version on the piano. McVie changed her mind after Buckingham "fashioned three sections out of identical chords, making each section sound completely different. He created the impression that there's a thread running through the whole thing."

Buckingham, in an interview with Nile Rodgers, said "In order to take a song of hers, like 'Dreams', which needed so much construction around it to take those same two chords and make them evolve from section A to section B to section C. And the love and the choice to do the right thing and to have the integrity to do that. It comes at a price sometimes, you know? It comes at the price of having your defences come up, and sometimes over a period of time, it's hard to get those down."

Reception
Cash Box said that "a softly droning bass backs Stevie Nicks' alluring lead vocal" and "subdued in comparison to the previous 'Go Your Own Way' this record has its own subtly building intensity."  Record World said that "Stevie Nicks' vocal makes these dreams a melodic reality."  New York Times critic John Rockwell called the single a "classy record" and commenting on the appeal provided by Stevie Nicks' "strange, nasal yet husky soprano" and on Mick Fleetwood's "wonderfully crisp, exact drumming."

Chart performance and legacy
In the United States, "Dreams" reached the number-one spot on the Billboard Hot 100 chart on 18 June 1977, and held it for one week. On the Adult Contemporary chart, "Dreams" was Fleetwood Mac's highest-charting single during the 1970s where it reached number 11. In the UK Singles Chart, "Dreams" went to number 24, staying in the top 40 for eight weeks.

Since its initial release, "Dreams" has re-entered the charts on various occasions. It picked up two additional weeks on the UK charts in 2011 following the airing of the Glee Rumours episode. In 2018, "Dreams" returned to the Billboard Hot Rock Songs chart at number 14, re-popularized by a viral tweet. The song also returned to the New Zealand charts for one week in 2019 at number 40.  The song then re-entered the New Zealand charts on 5 October 2020 at number 28, and has since spent 71 consecutive weeks in the top 40, whilst also reaching a new peak of 3 consecutive weeks at number 6. The same year, it also entered the Irish charts for the first time.

In October 2020, the song reached number one on the Billboard Rock Digital Song Sales chart as a result of a viral TikTok video of Nathan Apodaca lip syncing to the song while skateboarding down a highway in Idaho Falls, Idaho drinking Ocean Spray cran-raspberry juice. Following the popularity of the video, "Dreams" also placed among the Top 50 most-streamed songs on Spotify and Apple Music in the US, the UK, Australia, and New Zealand, re-entering the ARIA in Australia (where it reached a new peak) and the UK Official Charts. "Dreams" also re-entered the Billboard Hot 100 at number 21 on 17 October 2020, giving the band its highest placement on the Hot 100 since 20 February 1988, when "Everywhere" charted at number 17. "Dreams" then rose to number 12 the following week.

Personnel
Stevie Nickslead vocals, backing vocals
Christine McVieFender Rhodes electric piano, organ, vibraphone backing vocals
Lindsey Buckinghamelectric and acoustic guitars, backing vocals
Mick Fleetwooddrums, congas
John McViebass guitar

Charts

Weekly charts

Year-end charts

Certifications

The Corrs version

Irish band the Corrs originally recorded "Dreams" for Legacy: A Tribute to Fleetwood Mac's Rumours, the 20th anniversary album of cover versions which also featured "Don't Stop" by Elton John, "You Make Loving Fun" by Jewel and others from the Goo Goo Dolls and the Cranberries. The cover version was originally recorded similar to the original song until Oliver Leiber transformed the recording into a dance track mixed with a violin and tin whistle hook. It was then remixed by Todd Terry for single release and became the first big hit for the Corrs in the UK, reaching number six on the UK Singles Chart and staying on the chart for 10 weeks. The video also won the "Best Adult Contemporary Video" award from Billboard magazine in 1998. The Corrs' second studio album, Talk on Corners, was then re-released with "Dreams" added.

The Corrs performed "Dreams" with Mick Fleetwood from Fleetwood Mac in their concert at the Royal Albert Hall on St. Patrick's Day, 1998 (which was also Caroline Corr's 25th birthday).

Critical reception
Larry Flick from Billboard wrote, "The Corrs bring an interesting Celtic flavor to the first pop single from Legacy: A Tribute To Fleetwood Mac's Rumours. Although it's difficult to let go of the intense drama of the original recording, the act's earnest delivery is to be commended and appreciated. In an effort to better connect with the kids of crossover radio, club icon Todd Terry has been enlisted to remix the song with a more forceful disco sound. It was a wise move that gives this single a fighting chance in drawing the positive attention of the pop masses." Daily Record said the cover version is "superb". British newspaper Sunday Mirror stated that "Ireland's three most beautiful women and their brother should finally crack it over here with this Todd Terry remix."

Music video
A music video was made to accompany the song, directed by British music video director and editor Dani Jacobs. It was published on YouTube in September 2009. As of July 2022, the video has been viewed over 23 million times. The video for the Todd Terry Remix was published in March 2014. In 2020, it has got over 1 million views. The music video won the "Best Adult Contemporary Video" award from Billboard magazine in 1998.

Track listings

 UK CD1 "Dreams" (Tee's radio) – 3:53
 "Dreams" (Tee's new radio) – 3:32
 "Dreams" (TNT Pop extended) – 7:38
 "Dreams" (Tee's club) – 7:39
 "Dreams" (In House mix) – 4:32

 UK CD2 
 "Dreams" – 5:21
 "The Right Time" – 3:52
 "Queen of Hollywood" – 4:56
 "Haste to the Wedding" – 3:38

 UK cassette single "Dreams" (Tee's radio) – 3:53
 "Dreams" (Tee's AC radio) – 3:49

 European CD single "Dreams" (radio edit) – 3:59
 "Dreams" (Tee's radio) – 3:53

 Australian and Japanese CD single'''
 "Dreams" (radio edit) – 3:59
 "Dreams" (Tee's radio) – 3:53
 "Dreams" (Tee's new radio) – 3:32
 "Dreams" (TNT Pop extended mix) – 8:40
 "Dreams" (Tee's club) – 7:39
 "Dreams" (In House mix) – 4:32

Charts and certifications

Weekly charts

Year-end charts

Certifications

Release history

Deep Dish version

Nicks contributed new vocals to a remake of "Dreams" by DJ and house music duo Deep Dish. The song appears on their second album, George Is On (2005), and was a top-20 UK Singles Chart hit and climbed to number 26 on the US Hot Dance Club Play chart. An edited version of the song is included on Nicks' 2007 album Crystal Visions – The Very Best of Stevie Nicks''. In the music video, directed by Honey, model and actress Winter Ave Zoli plays as the protagonist.

Charts

Weekly charts

Year-end charts

Release history

Nathan Apodaca TikTok
In 2020, after his truck broke down, an Idaho man named Nathan Apodaca filmed himself riding his skateboard to work while drinking Ocean Spray cran-raspberry juice and lip-syncing to "Dreams". The video went viral, garnering over 50 million views around the world. As a result, "Dreams" skyrocketed in popularity, reappearing on many worldwide music charts. Mick Fleetwood, Lindsey Buckingham, and Stevie Nicks released responses to Apodaca's video on TikTok, with Nicks donning a pair of roller skates while performing the song. Subsequently, Ocean Spray gave Nathan a brand new pickup truck after Ocean Spray received unexpected publicity when the video went viral.

Jolyon Petch version
In 2021, the New Zealand-born, Australian-based DJ, Jolyon Petch released a version of the song that became a Number 1 track on the ARIA Top 50 Club Tracks chart. The cover, featuring an uncredited vocal from the reality TV star Reigan, peaked at number 16 on the main Australian singles chart.
The single went on to be nominated in the category of Best Dance Release at the 2021 ARIA Music Awards, but lost out to "Alive" by Rüfüs Du Sol. It was certified 2× Platinum by Australian Recording Industry Association (ARIA) in 2022.

References

External links
 
 

Songs about dreams
143 Records singles
1977 singles
1977 songs
1998 singles
2020s fads and trends
Atlantic Records singles
Billboard Hot 100 number-one singles
Cashbox number-one singles
RPM Top Singles number-one singles
Deep Dish (band) songs
Fleetwood Mac songs
Lava Records singles
Perfecto Records singles
Song recordings produced by Richard Dashut
Songs written by Stevie Nicks
Warner Records singles
Internet memes introduced in 2020
Songs about heartache